Jason Kennedy (born December 11, 1981) is an entertainment journalist. He is the host of E! News and Live from E! and a contributor to the NBC Today Show.

Biography 
Kennedy was born in Ft. Lauderdale, Florida. As a child, he produced a mock television news program from a home studio. Following his graduation from Westminster Academy, he attended the University of Miami, where he received several awards, including the Associated Press Award for Best News Feature in the state of Florida.

He moved to Los Angeles in 2004 and began anchoring segments for Open Call on the TV Guide Channel. He subsequently joined E! Network. Beginning in May 2008, Kennedy hosted  Dance Machine on ABC.

Personal life 
Kennedy began dating Lauren Scruggs in 2013. They were married on December 12, 2014 in Dallas, Texas. Jason and Lauren welcomed their son, Ryver Rhodes Kennedy, on April 3, 2022.

References

External links
Jason Kennedy biography at E! Online.

1981 births
Living people
American Christians
American infotainers
American television talk show hosts
People from Fort Lauderdale, Florida
University of Miami alumni